William Sheridan (12 March 1858 – 16 November 1931) was an Australian politician. He was born in Galway, Ireland. Having moved to Tasmania, he was elected to the Tasmanian House of Assembly in 1909 as a Labor member for Denison. He was defeated in 1913 but returned in a recount following the death of John Davies in 1914. In 1925 he switched seats to contest Franklin, which he held until his defeat in 1928. Sheridan died in Hobart.

References

1858 births
1931 deaths
19th-century Irish people
Members of the Tasmanian House of Assembly
Irish emigrants to Australia
Politicians from County Galway
Australian Labor Party members of the Parliament of Tasmania